This is a list of football (soccer) players from Armenia or of Armenian descent.

A

 Harutyun Abrahamyan
 Karlen Abramov
 Armen Adamyan
 Sargis Adamyan
 Vardan Adzemian
 Arkadi Akopyan
 Andrey Akopyants
 Artak Aleksanyan
 Karen Aleksanyan
 Valeri Aleksanyan
 Armen Ambartsumyan
 Arkady Andreasyan
 Ararat Arakelyan
 Can Arat
 Robert Arzumanyan
 Éric Assadourian
 Rudolf Atamalyan
 Garnik Avalyan
 Charles Avedisian
 Arsen Avetisyan
 Mayis Azizyan

B

 Armen Babalaryan 
 Artashes Baghdasaryan 
 Arsen Balabekyan 
 Tigran Barseghyan
 Henrik Batikyan 
 Khoren Bayramyan
 Pascal Bedrossian 
 Narek Beglaryan 
 Roman Berezovsky
 Edmond Bezik  
 Vahan Bichakhchyan
 Alain Boghossian 
 Joaquín Boghossian

C

 Andre Calisir
 Efrain Chacurian
 Hagop Chirishian

D

 Artak Dashyan 
 Hovhannes Demirchyan 
 Michel Der Zakarian 
 Yuri Djorkaeff
 Karen Dokhoyan 
 Agop Donabidian

E

 Eduard Eranosyan 
 Nshan Erzrumyan 
 Sergey Erzrumyan 
 Alecko Eskandarian 
 Andranik Eskandarian

G

 Gevorg Garabetian
 Poghos Galstyan
 Vahan Gevorgyan 
 Tigran Gharabaghtsyan
 Wartan Ghazarian 
 Gevorg Ghazaryan 
 Stepan Ghazaryan 
 Hovhannes Goharyan 
 Artak Grigoryan 
 David Grigoryan (footballer, born 1982) 
 David G. Grigoryan 
 Razmik Grigoryan
 Mauro Guevgeozián
 Artur Geworkýan

H

 Ara Hakobyan
 Aram Hakobyan
 Felix Hakobyan
 Florin Halagian
 Hovhannes Hambardzumyan
 Varazdat Haroyan
 Ararat Harutyunyan
 Harutyun Hovhannisyan
 Kamo Hovhannisyan
 Khoren Hovhannisyan
 Sargis Hovhannisyan
 Zhora Hovhannisyan
 Sargis Hovsepyan

K

 Eduard Kakosyan
 Manuk Kakosyan
 Khoren Kalashyan
 Artashes Kalaydzhan
 Arman Karamyan
 Artavazd Karamyan
 Harut Karapetyan 
 Sargis Karapetyan (born 1963)
 Sargis Karapetyan (born 1990)
 Gevorg Kasparov
 Vahram Kevorkian
 Ashot Khachatryan
 Romik Khachatryan
 Vardan Khachatryan
 Artem Khachaturov
 Andrey Khachaturyan
 Felix Khojoyan
 Barsegh Kirakosyan
 Yervand Krbachyan

M
 Edgar Malakyan
 David Manoyan
 Edgar Manucharyan
 Eduard Markarov
 Robert Markosi
 Grigor Meliksetyan
 Yegishe Melikyan
 Samvel Melkonyan
 Karapet Mikaelyan
 Arthur H. Minasyan
 Arthur S. Minasyan
 Vahagn Minasyan
 Vardan Minasyan
 Alexander Mirzoyan
 Hamlet Mkhitaryan
 Henrik Mkhitaryan
 Hrayr Mkoyan
 Aghvan Mkrtchyan
 Arthur Mkrtchyan
 Karlen Mkrtchyan
 Andrey Movsisyan
 Yura Movsisyan

N
Rafael Nazaryan
Ara Nigoyan

O

 Aras Ozbiliz
 Stepan Oganesyan

P

 Levon Pachajyan 
 Arsen Papikyan 
 Eduard Partsikyan  
 Armenak Petrosyan 
 Arthur Petrosyan 
 Galust Petrosyan 
 Nazar Petrosyan 
 Tigran Petrosyan

S

 Norayr Sahakyan
 Eduard Sarkisov
 Albert Sarkisyan
 Armen Shahgeldyan
 Gagik Simonyan
 Nikita Simonyan
 Eduard Spertsyan
 Arthur Stepanyan
 Kalin Stepanyan
 Levon Stepanyan
 Varuzhan Sukiasyan
 Yervand Sukiasyan

T

 Alexander Tadevosyan 
 Vahe Tadevosyan 
 Hovhannes Tahmazyan 
 Frédéric Tatarian 
 Andranik Teymourian
 Serjik Teymourian 
 Armen Tigranyan

V

 Harutyun Vardanyan
 Eduard Veranyan 
 Aram Voskanyan 
 Arthur Voskanyan
 Taron Voskanyan

Y

 Hiraç Yagan
 Yeghia Yavruyan 
 Artak Yedigaryan 
 Arthur Yedigaryan 
 Aramais Yepiskoposyan
 Tigran Yesayan 
 David Yurchenko
 Arthur Yuspashyan

Z

 Oganes Zanazanyan 
 Robert Zebelyan
 Lucas Zelarayán

References
 Armfootball.com

Incomplete sports lists
Lists of association football players by nationality
 
Footballers
Association football player non-biographical articles